John Chapman (18 January 1865 – 16 February 1949) was a New Zealand cricketer. He played in three first-class matches for Wellington from 1885 to 1887.

See also
 List of Wellington representative cricketers

References

External links
 

1865 births
1949 deaths
New Zealand cricketers
Wellington cricketers
Cricketers from Lower Hutt